Aalten is a municipality and a town in the eastern Netherlands. The former municipalities of Bredevoort (1818) and Dinxperlo (2005) have been merged with Aalten.

Notable inhabitants of Aalten include Angus Young, guitarist of the Australian rock band AC/DC, and Robert Gesink, a professional road bicycle racer.  During World War II, 51 of Aalten's 85 Jews were hidden by local non-Jews, and thereby survived the war. According to the War and Resistance Museum in Aalten, the village had the highest number of people in hiding during World War II. The village of approximately 13,000 residents hid some 2,500 people.

Population centres

Transportation
Aalten railway station serves Aalten and the surrounding area. There is a half-hourly service between Arnhem and Winterswijk, which stops at this station. Arnhem railway station has services to Amsterdam, Amsterdam Airport, Utrecht, Nijmegen, 's-Hertogenbosch, Breda, Tilburg and to cities in Germany.

Aalten also has an hourly bus service to Ruurlo and to Zelhem.

Notable people 
 Hendrickje Stoffels (1626 in Bredevoort – 1663) the longtime partner of Rembrandt
 J.T. Wamelink (1827 in Aalten – 1900) a prominent musician and composer in Cleveland, Ohio
 Vinus van Baalen (1942 in Dinxperlo – 2012) a Dutch swimmer, competed at the 1964 Summer Olympics
 Nout Wellink (born 1943 in Bredevoort) a Dutch economist and former central banker

Gallery

References

External links 

 

 
Municipalities of Gelderland
Populated places in Gelderland
Achterhoek
The Holocaust in the Netherlands